Filmmakers Alliance is a nonprofit organization based in Los Angeles. It was founded by Jacques Thelemaque and Diane Gaidry. Its over 300 members provide a support system through which members share time, energy, expertise, equipment and creative support for one another's film projects from concept through distribution.

It is best known for Visionfest, its yearly gala held every August at Directors Guild of America. The Vision Award, presented by Filmmakers Alliance at this event, has been given to such filmmakers as Terry Gilliam, Wim Wenders, and Alexander Payne. 

Also presented at Visionfest is The Los Angeles Short Filmmaking Grant, which provides the winning short screenplay with 35mm film from Kodak, a camera package from Panavision, film processing and production support from Filmmakers Alliance. Past winners of this grant include Elyse Couvillion and Sean Hood.

References

External links
Official Site

Film organizations in the United States
1977 establishments in the United States
Mass media companies established in 1977
Organizations established in 1977
Communications and media organizations based in the United States